Hinduri (or Handuri) is a Western Pahari language of northern India. It was classified as a dialect under the Kiunthali Group

Script

Status 
The language is commonly called Pahari or Himachali. Some speakers may even call it a dialect of Punjabi or Dogri. The language has no official status. According to the United Nations Education, Scientific and Cultural Organisation (UNESCO), the language is of critically endangered category, i.e. the youngest speakers of Handuri are generally grandparents or older and they too speak it infrequently or partially.

The demand for the inclusion of 'Pahari (Himachali)' under the Eight Schedule of the Constitution, which is supposed to represent multiple Pahari languages of Himachal Pradesh, had been made in the year 2010 by the state's Vidhan Sabha. There has been no positive progress on this matter since then even when small organisations are striving to save the language. Due to political interest, the language is currently recorded as a dialect of Hindi, even when having a poor mutual intelligibility with it.

References

Northern Indo-Aryan languages
Indo-Aryan languages
Languages of Himachal Pradesh
Endangered languages of India